Joe Edward Purcell (July 29, 1923 – March 5, 1987) was an American politician and attorney who served as Acting Governor of Arkansas for six days in 1979. A member of the Democratic Party, he served as the 45th Attorney General of Arkansas from 1967 to 1971 and the 13th Lieutenant Governor of Arkansas from 1975 to 1981.

Early career
Purcell was born in Warren, the seat of Bradley County, in southern Arkansas. He graduated from Little Rock Junior College and the  University of Arkansas School of Law at Fayetteville. From 1962 to 1967, he served as the municipal judge in Benton in Saline County. He also served as prosecuting attorney in Benton prior to having been elected judge.

Attorney General of Arkansas
In 1966, Purcell unseated Arkansas Attorney General Bruce Bennett, a strong segregationist from El Dorado, in the Democratic primary. He then defeated in the general election a stronger-than-usual opponent, Republican Jerry Thomasson, a former Democrat and state representative from Arkadelphia in Clark County.

Lieutenant Governor of Arkansas
In 1974, Purcell was elected to the lieutenant governorship; he handily defeated Republican Leona Troxell of Rose Bud in White County, a former associate of the late Governor Winthrop Rockefeller. He was reelected as Arkansas Lieutenant Governor in 1976 and 1978 under David Pryor and Bill Clinton. He served as Acting Arkansas Governor for six days in 1979, having filled the unexpired term of Pryor, who had been elected to the United States Senate.

Purcell was twice a candidate for the governorship. In 1970, he was considered the leading challenger to former governor Orval Faubus and ran second to Faubus throughout the primary race, but was edged out of a runoff berth by less than 500 votes by Charleston attorney Dale Bumpers, who went on to defeat Faubus and then Republican Governor Winthrop Rockefeller in the general election. Purcell was Bumpers' choice to chair the Arkansas Democratic Party, a position which he held from 1970 to 1973. His chief task as party chair was to purge followers of presidential candidate George Wallace of Alabama and former gubernatorial nominee James D. Johnson from the party ranks and to limit the influence of the Faubus-era "Old Guard" faction. He entered the Democratic gubernatorial primary in 1982 and surprisingly edged out former congressman Jim Guy Tucker for a runoff berth with former governor Bill Clinton. Purcell lost the Democratic nomination to Clinton in a runoff, 46 to 54 percent.

Private life
Purcell resided in Benton until his death at the age of 63.

Purcell married the former Helen Hale from Prescott, Arkansas; the couple had two daughters, Lynelle and Ede. He had three grandchildren: Brian Hogue, David Hogue and Erin Hogue.

Notes and references

1923 births
1987 deaths
20th-century American lawyers
20th-century American politicians
Acting Governors of Arkansas
Arkansas Attorneys General
Arkansas Democrats
Arkansas lawyers
Democratic Party governors of Arkansas
Lieutenant Governors of Arkansas
People from Benton, Arkansas
People from Bradley County, Arkansas
University of Arkansas people
University of Arkansas School of Law alumni